Karla Monroig (born March 5, 1979, in Guayama, Puerto Rico) is a Puerto Rican actress, model and television host.

Early years
Karla Monroig was born in Guayama, Puerto Rico, located on the southern coastal valley region of the island of Puerto Rico. Her father is of Catalan ancestry; her mother, is of Irish ancestry. She went to High school in a private school named ACADEMIA SAN ANTONIO located in her town. She went to college at the Universidad del Sagrado Corazón in Santurce, Puerto Rico, and has a college degree in Communications.
In 1995, at the early age of 14, she was the first runner up, of Miss Borinquen Teenage pageant, and she was awarded with the Culture Award.
In 1996, Monroig's interest in becoming a model arose, and she started taking modeling lessons in the Refine Institution of Modeling. She participated in the contest Cara de Imagen, (Face of Imagen Magazine), and was the first runner up once more.

Professional model
Immediately, her professional career as a model stirred up. She posed for the covers of several well-known Puerto Rican magazines such as: Buena Vida (Good Life), in 14 consecutive issues, Agenda de Novias (Bride's Agenda), and in "Imagen" (Image), in diverse editions. She's also written editorial articles about beauty and modeling in various paperback periodic publications, such as Tiempos (Times), stating her opinions and giving her perspectives about the subject.

New scope
In the year 2000, her incursions in new territories started broadening her horizons, as she becomes a news reporter, in the entertainment category, in the television talk show, Anda Pa'l Cará, (Gee Whiz), broadcast by Univision, Puerto Rico. As the year came about, she hosted a reality show with Hector Marcano, called Buscados (Most Wanted).
In 2001, she hosted another television current issues show called: E-ritmo T.V. (E-rhythm T.V.), in which she interviewed international celebrities, such as Alejandro Sanz, and Chayanne, among others. Also she was the co-host of the variety show Caliente (Hot), in Mexico, broadcast by Televisa.

Filmography

Telenovelas

See also

 List of Puerto Ricans
 Inocente de Ti
 Dueña y Señora
 Dame Chocolate
 Valentino Lanús
 Carlos Ponce
 Gladys Rodríguez

References

External links
 

1979 births
Living people
People from Guayama, Puerto Rico
Puerto Rican people of Catalan descent
21st-century Puerto Rican actresses
Puerto Rican television actresses
Puerto Rican telenovela actresses
Puerto Rican female models
Puerto Rican people of Irish descent
Universidad del Sagrado Corazón alumni